Manor House is an historic building in Gisburn Forest, Lancashire, England. It was built in the early 18th century, but contains a section that is believed to date to the 13th century. It has been designated a Grade II listed building by Historic England. 

It is a sandstone house with projecting quoins and a slate roof.  It has two storeys with an attic, and a symmetrical three-bay front.  The windows are sashes with plain surrounds.  The doorway has attached Tuscan columns, an open pediment, and a semicircular head with a fanlight.

In 1822, the "Manor of Gisburn Forest properly belongs to the lord of the Percy Fee," but the abbot and convent of Sallay owned the wood and herbage. It came into the ownership of Thomas Browne, of Burton-upon-Trent around that time.

See also
Listed buildings in Gisburn Forest

References

18th-century establishments in England
Houses completed in the 18th century
Grade II listed buildings in Lancashire
Houses in Lancashire
Buildings and structures in Ribble Valley